San Justo is the Spanish name for Saint Justus. 

As a place-name, San Justo may refer to:

 San Justo, Santa Fe, the main township of San Justo Department, Argentina
 San Justo Department (disambiguation), various places
 San Justo, Buenos Aires, a town in La Matanza Partido, Argentina
 San Justo, Entre Ríos, a town in Entre Ríos, Argentina
 San Justo, Zamora, a municipality in the province of Zamora, Spain